Hovari (also, Həveri, Govari and Goveri) is a village in the Lerik Rayon of Azerbaijan.   The village forms part of the municipality of Şonacola. The village contains a necropolis dating from the late Bronze Age to early Iron Age.

References 

Populated places in Lerik District